Mardan Palace is a luxury hotel in Lara, Antalya, Turkey, built by Azerbaijani businessman Telman Ismailov. It has been called Europe's and the Mediterranean's most expensive luxury resort.

History
It was opened on 23 May 2009 and attended by Mariah Carey, Kendall Jenner, Sharon Stone, Richard Gere, Monica Bellucci, Paris Hilton, Seal, Tom Jones, and the Kazakhstani President Nursultan Nazarbayev. Some football clubs like Shakhtar Donetsk and Steaua Bucharest, 2011 and respectively 2012, were guests of honor. The teams held their training camps in Antalya at the invitation of Telman Ismailov, who supported all the costs. The corporate identity and website for the hotel was created by Brash Brands in Dubai, winning it an International Design Award.
It is also known as Mardan Khan because of its luxury and according to Telman Ismailov at the time of its establishment. Its pool is one of the largest in Europe and its aquarium with more than 2,400 fish is one of the largest in Europe. In December 2018, it was announced that Titanic Hotels, whose properties include Beach Lara and Deluxe Belek, would take over the hotel. It is unconfirmed when the hotel will reopen.

Cost
Mardan Palace's reported cost is $1.4 billion. It has the Mediterranean's largest swimming pool within which is a sunken aquarium containing 2,400 fish. The hotel has 560 rooms, a  spa, and its own beach containing 9,000 tons of sand imported from Egypt. 10,000 m2 of gold, 500,000 crystals, 23,000 m2 of Italian marble were used in the construction of the hotel.

The hotel was sold to Halkbank for just $124 million in late 2015.

Facilities

The hotel boasts a 5-acre pool and at the center of it is their seafood restaurant. The restaurant is surrounded by 4 aquariums that host over 3,000 varieties of fish.

References

External links
 Official site

Hotels in Antalya
Hotel buildings completed in 2009
Hotels established in 2009
2009 establishments in Turkey